Marcus Antoninus may refer to:

 Marcus Aurelius Antoninus (Marcus Aurelius) (121–180), Roman emperor from 161 to 180
 Marcus Aurelius Commodus Antoninus (Commodus) (161–192), Roman emperor from 180 to 192
 Marcus Aurelius Antoninus (Caracalla) (188–217), Roman emperor from 198 to 217
 Marcus Opellius Antoninus Diadumenianus (Diadumenian) (208–218), Roman emperor in 218
 Marcus Aurelius Antoninus (Elagabalus) (203/4–222), Roman emperor from 218 to 222